Frances "Fanny" Erskine Inglis, later the Marquesa of Calderón de la Barca (Edinburgh, Scotland, 1804 – Madrid, Spain, 1882), was born to a family of the nobility and was a 19th-century travel writer best known for her 1843 account, Life in Mexico, which is widely regarded by historians as one of the most influential Latin American travel narratives of the 19th century.

Early life
Inglis was born in Edinburgh, Scotland in 1804, the 5th child of her Scottish parents, members of the Scottish gentry. Her father was a distinguished lawyer (Writer to the Signet) and first cousin of the Earl of Buchan, while her mother came from the very wealthy Stein family, known for their role in politics and as the founders of industrial scale distilling. Her father was a distinguished lawyer  and her mother came from a wealthy Scottish family who had profited from distillery. When Inglis' father's law firm suffered from bankruptcy, her family moved to Normandy, France, and later to Boston, after his death and her mother's remarriage in 1831. During this time, Inglis traveled to Italy as a young girl to complete her education.

In Boston, she and her family opened a school for girls, where Inglis worked as a schoolteacher. However, the decline of the school led her family to move to New Brighton, in Staten Island, New York, a place of particular interest to diplomats, such as the Spanish minister to the United States, Ángel Calderón de la Barca, retreating there from Washington, D.C.’s hot summers. Inglis and Ángel met in 1836 through the mutual acquaintance of prominent historian, William Hickling Prescott, who had brought Ángel to New York due to interest in his Spanish source materials. On 24 September 1838, Inglis and Ángel Calderón de la Barca married, and Frances Erskine Inglis became Frances "Fanny" Calderón de la Barca. The couple moved to Mexico in 1839, when Ángel became Spanish minister to Mexico as part of Spain's attempt to recognize Mexico's independence. They resided in Mexico for the next two years, during which Fanny Calderón de la Barca wrote the letters that would eventually comprise her 1843 travel book, Life in Mexico.

Career
Frances Erskine Inglis is best known for her book La vida en México durante una residencia de dos años en este país (Life in Mexico, During a Residence Of Two Years In That Country) which was published under the name Madame Calderón de la Barca in Boston and London in 1843. She also wrote El agregado en Madrid o Bocetos de la Corte de Isabel II (1856).

La vida en México is a classic of its genre, one of the few travelogues written by a European woman living in Mexico during the early years of Mexican Independence.

Life in Mexico

Life in Mexico is a travel narrative published by William Hickling Prescott in 1843, which contains 54 letters Fanny Calderón wrote during her two years in Mexico (October 1839-February 1842). It describes the politics, people, and landscape of Mexico through the eyes of a Spanish diplomat's wife, thus providing a unique lens into the culture, which is why Prescott applauded its ethnographical and historiographical significance.

Overall, the account documents class distinctions of Mexican women, perspectives on Indians, and the tumultuous political atmosphere, including two revolutions.

In terms of politics, Calderón pokes fun at the male elite through sarcasm and irony. Appalled by the violence, she focuses primarily on the role of ordinary people rather than political leaders in the revolution, such as the women fleeing the bloodshed and the statesmen and literary figures of Mexican society. Concluding that Spain is integral to Mexico's functioning as an independent country, Calderón implies an imperialist motive in her writing. She further critiques the patriarchy in contrasting the conditions faced by men and women in the Mexican Catholic Church. Whereas monks are given comfortable conditions, nuns are placed into prison-like confinement, a reality that Calderón strongly opposes.

Writing in the vein of Romanticism, Calderón describes the Mexican landscape through picturesque elements, identifying with historical figures such as Spanish conquistador Cortés and his indigenous mistress, Malinche. She paints the terrain as an almost Biblical Eden of unexploited resources that would contribute to the United States' objective to invade Mexico.

As a woman with Scottish, American, Spanish, and Mexican ties, Calderón crosses the boundaries of nationality, being drawn to Mexican concert balls and indigenous dress. However, she maintains a level of superiority due to her upper-class status, which colors her perceptions of the lower classes.

In her Forty-Ninth letter, Calderón begins depicting the beautiful scenery of the Trojes "to see the mining establishment; the mills for grinding ore, the horizontal water-wheels, etc., etc.; and still more, the beautiful scenery in the neighborhood." She juxtaposes the initial sound setting with her account of an Indian couple she comes across whilst on the road. The couple is estranged as the two are under in her estimation the homeopathic extract mezcal Because homeopathy is a pseudoscience, the couple is in distress. She cites the woman reportingly saying to her husband “Mátame, Miguel, mátame” (Kill me, Miguel — kill me)," and making note.
"— apparently considering herself quite unfit to live." After some traveling, she and her company find suitable living with a man who is only described to be a part of the bourgeois and his family. She notes how the bourgeois man only had room for the women of the company, where "the gentlemen found lodging for themselves in a bachelor’s house." From the company helping run house errands for the host family, Calderón makes note of what the leading man of the estate says to them before the bid for the night. "Me cuadra mucho la gente decente” (I am very fond of decent people)." As the days progress, Calderón and company meet favorable condictions on the road, and are able to rest at nights with a more favorable host, Señor Don Joaquin Gomez, of Valladolid, as he is able to take the women and men as guests on his property. Before making it to the city of Moreila, she describes romantically the wild undomesticated area that they pass through. "The lilac deepened into purple, blushed into rose-colour, brightened into crimson. The blue of the sky assumed that green tint peculiar to an Italian sunset. The sun himself appeared a globe of living flame."

In another part of the book, Calderón describes the lack of books and available literature found in Mexico. She states, "There are no circulating libraries in Mexico. Books are at least double the price that they are in Europe. There is no diffusion of useful knowledge amongst the people; neither cheap pamphlets nor cheap magazines written for their amusement or instruction". The lack of a well read population may have influenced Calderón's view of Mexican society as uneducated or unintelligent. This view, as well as many other comments made by Calderón in the narrative, led to the book being negatively received by Mexicans and Spaniards in Mexico after its publication.

Historical significance 
Life in Mexico, with its detailed descriptions of Mexican people and terrain, became instrumental to the United States' war effort during Mexican–American War of 1846-48. In fact, the United States government consulted with Calderón and Prescott personally to gain intel that would eventually lead to the United States' invasion of Mexico. Today, much of the information that modern historians have about everyday Mexican life in this period comes from these narratives.

The Attaché in Madrid
Published in New York in 1856 under the male pseudonym of a young German diplomat, Calderón's The Attaché in Madrid is, by far, her lesser known travel account. Although it was used as part of Spanish history, it has become more or less forgotten. This is partially due to its publication under a male name, which would have diminished the uniqueness of the female perspective present in Life in Mexico, since many male-authored travel accounts from writers such as Washington Irving had already been written on 19th-century Spain. Because her husband was now a diplomat in Spain, Calderón  could not speak openly about Spanish life and had to be careful to conceal her identity.

Much like in Life in Mexico, Calderón describes the "charitable institutions" formerly of interest to her under the guise of the curiosity of her male persona's mother. She uses "his" family members’ interests as justifications for descriptions that might not have otherwise been significant to a male travel writer. But simultaneously, she also utilizes this male identity to speak on topics inaccessible to females of her class, such as the San Isidro Festival, the Burial of the Sardine and bullfights. In addition, by offering the "German" outsider's perspective, she frees her narrative from the typical mid-19th-century United States discourse on Spanish decadence, instead showing her German Catholic narrator's admiration of Spain.

Although she uses "anonymity" and "maleness" to justify her point of view, Calderón actually reconstructs the concept by offering multiple perspectives contrary to the primary theme of "domination" in male travel writing. For instance, as if in response to claims in male narratives about the infidelity of Spanish women, Calderón ’s narrator defends their honor. In effect, his "masculine voice" is only one amongst others, male and female, Spanish and foreigner, providing a balanced view that distinguishes her from authentic male travel writers.

Despite being poorly received in comparison to Life in Mexico, The Attaché in Madrid did experience a brief resurgence in 1898, after Calderón's death, having been circulated from the United States to Havana, Cuba, and discovered by a Spanish artillery captain, Cristobal de Reyna. He considered it a "valuable historical document" and published it under the name, "Don Ramiro", fully accepting its maleness and unaware of its true authorship.

Later life
After returning from Mexico in 1843, Fanny Calderón and her husband resided in Washington, D.C. for 9 years before he was reassigned to Spain, where he died in 1861. During that time, she converted to Catholicism in 1847. Following her husband's death in 1861, Calderón served as the governess of Infanta Isabel, the daughter of Isabella II, for two decades. In 1873, she was awarded the title, Marquesa de Calderón de la Barca. She died in Madrid, Spain on 6 February 1882 at the age of 77.

References

External links

 
 
 
 

19th-century Scottish writers
19th-century British women writers
1804 births
1882 deaths
Converts to Roman Catholicism
Marquesses of Spain
Scottish emigrants to the United States
British expatriates in Mexico
Scottish expatriates in Spain
Scottish memoirists
Scottish travel writers
British women travel writers
Writers from Edinburgh
British women memoirists